Anabel Medina Garrigues and Virginia Ruano Pascual were the defending champions, but lost in the semifinals to Iveta Benešová and Barbora Záhlavová-Strýcová.

Iveta Benešová and Barbora Záhlavová-Strýcová won in the final 7–5, 6–4, against Petra Cetkovská and Lucie Šafářová.

Seeds

  Anabel Medina Garrigues /  Virginia Ruano Pascual (semifinals)
  Nathalie Dechy /  Sania Mirza  (first round)
  Mariya Koryttseva  /  Tatiana Perebiynis  (first round)
  Iveta Benešová /  Barbora Záhlavová-Strýcová (champions)

Draw

Draw

External links 
Draw

Doubles 2008
Nordea Nordic Light Open
Nordic